Pomaderris cocoparrana, commonly known as Cocoparra pomaderris, is a species of flowering plant in the family Rhamnaceae and is endemic to a restricted area of New South Wales. It is a shrub with hairy stems, egg-shaped to more or less round leaves, and clusters of yellow flowers.

Description
The upper surface of the leaves is dark green and glossy, the lower surface with greyish and rust-coloured hairs.

Taxonomy
Pomaderris cocoparrana was first formally described in 1990 by Neville Grant Walsh in the journal Muelleria from specimens collected by James Hamlyn Willis in the Cocoparra Range in 1969. The specific epithet (cocoparrana) refers to the type location.

Distribution and habitat
This pomaderris is only known from rocky sites in the Cocoparra Range near Griffth in south-western New South Wales.

Conservation status
Pomaderris cocoparrana is listed as "endangered" under the Australian Government Environment Protection and Biodiversity Conservation Act 1999 and the New South Wales Government Biodiversity Conservation Act 2016. The main threats to the species include grazing by feral goats and inappropriate fire regimes.

References

cocoparrana
Flora of New South Wales
Plants described in 1990